The Westside Service Station and Riverside Motel, at 325 W. River St. in Eureka, Kansas, was built in 1939.  It was listed on the National Register of Historic Places in 2012.

The complex includes:
an office and café building built in 1939, which has a steeply pitched roof as in Tudor Revival-style buildings.
one-story Ranch-style motel building (c.1950-55)
three woodframe sleeping cabins with attached carports, faced with limestone "reflecting a common regional architectural style known as Ozark Giraffe".

References

External links

Gas stations on the National Register of Historic Places in Kansas
National Register of Historic Places in Greenwood County, Kansas
Buildings and structures completed in 1939